Calista is an unincorporated community in Kingman County, Kansas, United States.  It was named from the Greek Callista, meaning "most beautiful".

History
Calista became a community in 1886 after the community of Maud (1881-1886) was moved there. This original community known as "Old Calista" lasted until 1896 when the community had to be moved to make way for the Atchison, Topeka and Santa Fe Railway. "New" Calista was founded about two miles west-southwest of "Old" Calista and was a town until 1955. Now Calista only has a few buildings remaining and a small grain elevator open for about two weeks a year during the wheat harvest.

Geography
Calista is located in southern Kansas about nine miles west of the city of Kingman and is near the south bank of the Ninnescah River.

Education
The community is served by Kingman–Norwich USD 331 public school district.

References

Further reading

External links
 Kingman County maps: Current, Historic, KDOT

Unincorporated communities in Kingman County, Kansas
Unincorporated communities in Kansas